The Bono, also called the Brong and the Abron, are an Akan people of West Africa. Bonos are normally tagged Akan  or Akandifo of which Akan is a derivative name. Bono is the genesis and cradle of Akans. Bono is one of the largest ethnic group of Akan and are matrilineal people. Bono people speak the Bono Twi of Akan language. Twi language, thus the dialect of Bono is a derivative of a Bono King Nana Twi. In the late fifteenth century, the Bono people founded the Gyaaman kingdom as extension of Bono state in what is now Ghana and Côte d'Ivoire.

In the 12th century when Bonos discovered gold at the Twi river and Prabom across the Tain river, Bonos became very powerful owing to its wealth in gold at Bonoman. Bonos used the gold dust as a measure of currency in Bonoman and at the various market centres of Djenne, Timbuktu and North Africa .In most cases, gold weighing were used to determine what quantity of gold should be exchanged for a commodity. Bono people were dexterously noted for brass casting, weaving of cloth (gagawuga, kyenkyen and kente), pottery and so on. Around 1471, when the Portuguese arrived at the Gold Coast, Begho of Bonoman was one of the largest ancient cities in West Africa with an estimated population 12,000.

Bono Manso, another historic city, played a noteworthy role in the Atlantic slave trade, and in contemporary times, diaspora Africans often visit to learn more about their history. Traditionally, Bono is the hub of Akan cultures, and many aspects of Akan culture originate from Bono, e.g. clans (abusua), ntoro, Akan drums (fontomfrom, atumpan), Akan nomenclature, umbrellas used for kings, adinkra symbols, fly whisk, ivory trumpets, head gears, swords of the nation. Bonos perform many Akan traditional dances such as Kete, Adowa, fontomfrom, and other dances.
The bono people are most located in Ghana in the north

Etymology 
Bono means "pioneer" or the "first born on the land". In the olden days, among the Bonos if a woman gives birth for the first time this is referred to as her abonowoo.

History 
Bonos migrated from Ancient Ghana. Due to the imposition on them of another practice, they fled to the southern part of the Black Volta river and the tropical forest of central Ghana in order to maintain their Bono Ancestral worship and spirituality.  According to oral tradition, a moiety of Bonos emerged out of a hole called Amonwi cave due to an earthquake at Pinihini near Fiema in Nkoransa state, and converged with the former group at thither. With the leader being Ohene Asaman in consultation with his god ( or ) for guidance, the god advised him to build towns or states. The god therefore got his laudatory name Biakuru, meaning "he who builds towns". Bonos then proceeded to build a town called Yefiri (literally “we are coming out of the cave”).  Ohene Asaman of the falcon clan Ayoko and the Bonohemaa Ameyaa Kesse built another town as an extension and named it Bono Manso which became a capital to Bonoman with a confederation of seven powerful clans. Some other settlements were named after  that occupied that land. The Krontihene however stayed still at Yefiri. The families that came along were encouraged to live apart from each other, in different parts of the acquired territory.

Culture and society

Bonos concept of Bonoman (Bono State) 
Traditionally, a state could not be founded without a queenmother in the olden days, although many states were founded without a king. As the succession was (and still is) in the female line and as only the maternal ancestors were (and are) venerated, it was very essential that a female of royal blood gave birth to a state. That is why a queenmother owns a state, as a mother owns a child. The queenmother is always seen as the daughter of the moon by Bonos, who symbolizes the female characteristics of Nyame, the Supreme Being who created the universe by giving birth to the sun (Amowia). The sun is therefore regarded as the son of the moon and is personified as the Sungod. The queenmother therefore is represented as the great Mother-Moon-goddess, the king as the Sungod, and the state as the Universe. Silver represents moonlight as the colour of the queenmother, just as gold, the colour of the sun, represents the king.  Perceived from another angle, seven heavenly bodies Moon, Sun, Mars, Mercury, Jupitar, Venus and Saturn rule the heaven. Seven abusua or matrilineal clans represent them on earth and rule the state.

References

Ethnic groups in Ghana
Ethnic groups in Ivory Coast